Zographus lineatus is a species of beetle in the family Cerambycidae. It was described by Quedenfeldt in 1882, originally under the genus Quimalanca. It has a wide distribution in Africa.

References

Sternotomini
Beetles described in 1882